The Morehead State Eagles women's basketball team is the women's basketball team that represents Morehead State University in Morehead, Kentucky, United States.  The team currently competes in the Ohio Valley Conference.

History
Morehead State began play in 1970. They joined the Ohio Valley Conference (OVC) in 1977. They won the Ohio Valley Conference women's basketball tournament in 1979, finishing off a year in which they went 28-4 (and 8–1 in OVC play). They have made the postseason in 2010 (WBI) and 2017 (WNIT). As of the end of the 2015–16 season, the Eagles had an all-time record of 542–632.

References

External links